Korindo may refer to:

 Korindo (Raëlian temple)
 Korindo Aikido
 Korindo Group, see

See also
 Korino
 Korando